Hermann Erlhoff (22 December 1944 – 17 February 2022) was a German professional football player and coach.

Playing career
Erlhoff played as a defender and midfielder for TSV Marl-Hüls, FC Schalke 04 and Rot-Weiss Essen. He made a total of 162 appearances in the Bundesliga, scoring 15 goals. He was also the league's second ever substitute player.

Coaching career
After retiring as a player in 1976, Erlhoff became a coach at Rot-Weiss Essen before becoming manager. He later coached at a number of amateur teams, including Rot-Weiß Oberhausen and SpVgg Erkenschwick. He also managed women's team FFC Flaesheim-Hillen, who he led to the final of the 2000–01 DFB-Pokal Frauen, which the club lost.

Later life and death
Erlhoff later worked as a sports teacher. After suffering from dementia, he died on 17 February 2022, at the age of 77.

References

1944 births
2022 deaths
German footballers
Association football defenders
Association football midfielders
Bundesliga players
TSV Marl-Hüls players
FC Schalke 04 players
Rot-Weiss Essen players
German football managers
Rot-Weiss Essen non-playing staff
Rot-Weiss Essen managers
Rot-Weiß Oberhausen non-playing staff
Association football coaches
Deaths from dementia
People from Herten
Sportspeople from Münster (region)
Footballers from North Rhine-Westphalia
West German footballers
West German football managers